66 Eridani is a binary star in the constellation of Eridanus. The combined apparent magnitude of the system is 5.12 on average. Parallax measurements by Hipparcos put the system at some 309 light-years (95 parsecs) away.

This is a spectroscopic binary: the two stars cannot be individually resolved, but periodic Doppler shifts in its spectrum mean there must be orbital motion. The two stars orbit each other every 5.5226013 days. Their orbit is fairly eccentric, at 0.0844.

The combined spectrum of 66 Eridani matches that of a B-type main-sequence star, and the two stars have similar masses. The spectrum also shows excess of mercury and manganese, as it is a type of chemically peculiar star called a mercury-manganese star. 66 Eridani is an Alpha2 Canum Venaticorum variable. For this reason, it has been given the designation EN Eridani.

References

Eridanus (constellation)
Eridani, 66
B-type main-sequence stars
Spectroscopic binaries
Alpha2 Canum Venaticorum variables
Durchmusterung objects
032964
023794
1657
Eridani, EN